FRSC can refer to:

 Federal Road Safety Corps of Nigeria
 Fellow of the Royal Society of Canada
 Fellow of the Royal Society of Chemistry
 Free Radio Santa Cruz
 Fuel-rich staged combustion